Namba Parks (なんばパークス Nanba Pākusu) is an office and shopping complex located in Namba-naka Nichome, Naniwa-ku, Osaka, Japan, the south of Namba Station on Nankai Railway. It consists of a high-rise office building called Parks Tower and a 120-tenant shopping mall with rooftop garden. Namba Parks was developed by Jon Jerde of The Jerde Partnership in the footprint of the since closed Osaka Stadium.

There is a carnival mall on the 1st floor. For shopping, various shops are available on 2nd to 5th floor. Casual restaurants are located on 6th floor while fine-dining restaurants are on the 7th and 8th floor, where you can choose from various kinds of food, such as Japanese, Korean, and Italian. The 9th floor (topmost) has landscape garden. There is also an amphitheater for live shows, as well as space for small personal vegetable gardens and wagon shops.

Namba Parks was conceived as a large park, a natural intervention in Osaka's dense urban condition. Alongside a 30-story tower, the project features a lifestyle commercial center crowned with a rooftop park that crosses multiple blocks while gradually ascending eight levels. In addition to providing a highly visible green component in a city where nature is sparse, the sloping park connects to the street, making it easy for passers-by to enter its groves of trees, clusters of rocks, cliffs, lawn, streams, waterfalls, ponds and outdoor terraces. Beneath the park, a canyon carves a path through specialty retail, entertainment and dining venues.

See also
Jerde-associated architectural projects in Japan:
Canal City Hakata (Fukuoka)
Riverwalk Kitakyushu
Roppongi Hills (Tokyo)

External links

 Official website in Japanese and English
 John Jerde´s website - the architect of the complex

Tourist attractions in Osaka
Skyscrapers in Osaka
Nankai Group
Skyscraper office buildings in Japan
Retail buildings in Japan